The 2009 Quebec Men's Provincial Curling Championship (Quebec men's provincial curling championship) was held February 8–15 at the Valleyfield Arena in Salaberry-de-Valleyfield, Quebec. The winning team represented Quebec at the 2009 Tim Hortons Brier in Calgary.

Teams

Group A

Group B

Standings

Group A

Group B

Results

Draw 1
February 9, 0830

Draw 2
February 9, 1230

Draw 3
February 9, 1630

Draw 4
February 9, 2100

Draw 5
February 10, 0830

Draw 6
February 10, 1230

Draw 7
February 10, 1630

Draw 8
February 10, 2030

Draw 9
February 11, 0830

Draw 10
February 11, 1230

Draw 11
February 11, 1630

Draw 12
February 11, 2030

Draw 13
February 12, 0830

Draw 14
February 12, 1230

Draw 15
February 12, 1630

Draw 16
February 12, 2030

Draw 17
February 13, 0830

Draw 18
February 13, 1230

Tiebreakers
February 13, 1930

February 14, 0900

Playoffs

A2 vs. B3
February 14, 1400

A3 vs. B2
February 14, 1400

Quarterfinal
February 14, 1900

A1 vs. B1
February 14, 1900

Semifinal
February 15, 0900

Final
February 15, 1400

Quebec Mens Provincial Curling Championship, 2009
Salaberry-de-Valleyfield
Curling competitions in Quebec
2009 in Quebec